Peter III of Aragon (  November 1285) was King of Aragon, King of Valencia (as ), and Count of Barcelona (as ) from 1276 to his death. At the invitation of some rebels, he conquered the Kingdom of Sicily and became King of Sicily in 1282, pressing the claim of his wife, Constance II of Sicily, uniting the kingdom to the crown.

Youth and succession
Peter was the eldest son of James I of Aragon and his second wife Violant of Hungary. Among opportunistic betrothals of his youth, he was betrothed to Eudoxia Laskarina, the youngest daughter of Theodoros II Laskaris, in or before 1260 (claim not substantiated). This contract was dissolved, however, after Eudoxia's brother lost the imperial throne in 1261, and Eudoxia was instead married to the Count of Tenda. On 13 June 1262, Peter married Constance II of Sicily, daughter and heiress of Manfred of Sicily. During his youth and early adulthood, Peter gained a great deal of military experience in his father's wars of the Reconquista against the Moors.

In June 1275, Peter besieged, captured, and executed his rebellious half-brother Fernando Sánchez de Castro at Pomar de Cinca.

On his father's death in 1276, the lands of the Crown of Aragon were divided amongst his two sons. The Kingdom of Aragon, the Kingdom of Valencia and the Catalan counties went to Peter III as being the eldest son; while the Kingdom of Majorca and the Catalan counties beyond the Pyrenees went to the second son, who became James II of Majorca.

Peter and Constance were crowned in Zaragoza in November 1276 by the archbishop of Tarragona.

Early rebellions

Peter's first act as king was to complete the pacification of his Valencian territory, an action which had been underway before his father's death.

However, a revolt soon broke out in Catalonia, led by the viscount of Cardona and abetted by Roger-Bernard III of Foix, Arnold Roger I of Pallars Sobirà, and Ermengol X of Urgell. The rebels had developed a hatred for Peter as a result of the severity of his dealings with them during the reign of his father. Now they opposed him for not summoning the Catalan Courts, and confirming its privileges after his ascension to the throne.

At the same time, a succession crisis continued in the County of Urgell. When Àlvar of Urgell died in 1268, the families of his two wives, Constance, a daughter of Pere de Montcada of Bearn, and Cecilia, a daughter of Roger-Bernard II of Foix, began a long fight over the inheritance of his county. Meanwhile, a good portion of the county had been repossessed by Peter's father, James I, and was thus inherited by Peter in 1276. In 1278, Ermengol X, Àlvar's eldest son, succeeded in recovering most of his lost patrimony and came to an agreement with Peter whereby he recognised the latter as his suzerain.

In 1280, Peter defeated the stewing rebellion led by Roger-Bernard III after besieging the rebels in Balaguer for a month. Most of the rebel leaders were imprisoned in Lleida until 1281, while Roger-Bernard was imprisoned until 1284.

Wars abroad

Tunisia
When Muhammad I al-Mustansir, the Hafsid Emir of Tunisia who had put himself under James I of Aragon, died in 1277, Tunisia threw off the yoke of Aragonese suzerainty. Peter first sent an expedition to Tunis in 1280 under Conrad de Llansa designed to re-establish his suzerainty. In 1281, he himself prepared to lead a fleet of 140 ships with  men to invade Tunisia on behalf of the governor of Constantine. The fleet landed at Alcoyll in 1282. It was these Aragonese troops that received a Sicilian embassy after the Vespers of 30 March asking Peter to take their throne from Charles I of Anjou.

War of the Sicilian Vespers

In 1266, Charles I of Naples, with the approval of Pope Clement IV, invaded the Kingdom of Sicily, governed by the house of Hohenstaufen, which was the house of Peter's wife, Constance II of Sicily, daughter of Manfred of Sicily and rightful heir to the throne of Sicily after the deaths of her father and cousin Conradin fighting against Charles's invading forces. This made Peter the heir of Manfred of Sicily in right of his wife.

The Italian physician John of Procida acted on behalf of Peter in Sicily. John had fled to Aragon after Charles' success at the Battle of Tagliacozzo. John travelled to Sicily to stir up the discontents in favour of Peter and thence to Constantinople to procure the support of Michael VIII Palaiologos. Michael refused to aid the Aragonese king without papal approval, and so John voyaged to Rome and there gained the consent of Pope Nicholas III, who feared the ascent of Charles in the Mezzogiorno. John then returned to Barcelona but the Pope died, to be replaced by Pope Martin IV, a Frenchman and a staunch ally of Charles and the Anjou dynasty. This set the stage for the upcoming conflict.

Constance thus claimed to her father's throne, supported by her husband, but the claim was fruitless, as Charles was supported by the Papacy and his power remained stronger. The election of a new Pope Nicholas III in 1277 gave the King of Aragon a glimpse of hope, but Nicholas somehow died in 1280 and a pro-French Pope Martin IV dissipated hopes.

Peter nevertheless had begun making strategic alliances with his neighbouring monarchs. Peter made his brother James II of Majorca sign the treaty of Perpignan in 1279, in which he recognized the Kingdom of Majorca as a feudal kingdom of Peter III (making the Crown of Aragon an indissoluble unity). Peter  pressed his advantage and by February 1283 had taken most of the Calabrian coastline. Charles, perhaps feeling desperate, sent letters to Peter demanding they resolve the conflict by personal combat. Peter accepted and Charles returned to France to arrange the duel. Both kings chose six knights to settle on places and dates, and a duel was scheduled for 1 June at Bordeaux. A hundred knights would accompany each side and Edward I of England would adjudge the contest; the English king, heeding the pope, however, refused to take part. Peter left John of Procida in charge of Sicily and returned via his own kingdom to Bordeaux, which he entered in disguise to evade a suspected French ambush. Needless to say, no combat ever took place and Peter returned to find a very turbulent Aragon.

He also had a long-lasting friendly relationship with the Kingdom of Castile, establishing a strong alliance between realms by signing the treaties of Campillo and Ágreda in 1281 with Alfonso X of Castile and infant Sancho.

With the Kingdom of Portugal, Peter established a marital alliance by which his eldest daughter Elizabeth of Aragon married Denis I of Portugal. Peter also made alliance with the Kingdom of England, engaging his heir Alfonso III with Eleanor of England, daughter of Edward I of England. Despite all these alliances, Peter kept his bad relationship with the Kingdom of France.

On 30 March 1282 there was a popular uprising in the Kingdom of Sicily called the Sicilian Vespers, against the government of Charles I of Anjou. The noble sicilian rebels asked for Peter for help and offered him the crown as they considered his wife Constance their rightful Queen, and after receiving an embassy from the people of Palermo at Alcoy, Peter landed at Trapani on 30 August 1282. He was proclaimed King in Palermo on 4 September. Charles was forced to flee across the Straits of Messina and be content with his Kingdom of Naples. Pope Martin IV excommunicated both Peter and Michael VIII Palaiologos for providing Peter with  gold pieces to invade Sicily.

Catalan ground troops were commanded by Guillem Galceran de Cartellà, and were formed by the famous and feared almogavars, crossbowmen, and lancers. Peter's powerful fleet was commanded by Roger of Lauria, and constantly repelled Angevin attacks to the island. Roger de Lauria defeated the French forces at the Battle of Malta, and at the Bay of Naples in 1284, where Charles was made prisoner.

The conquest of Sicily was financed by Jewish contributions and taxes charged to the aljamas. The infant Alfonso demanded them an allowance of  sous in 1282. The Kingdom of Sicily was to be a tenaciously-pursued inheritance for the Aragonese royal house and its heirs for the next five centuries.

Later domestic unrest
Peter was dealing with domestic unrest at the time when the French were preparing an invasion of Aragon. He took Albarracín from the rebellious noble Juan Núñez de Lara, he renewed the alliance with Sancho IV of Castile, and he attacked Tudela in an attempt to prevent Philip I of Navarre from invading on that front. Peter held meetings of the cortes at Tarragona and Zaragoza in 1283. He was forced to grant the Privilegio General to the newly formed Union of Aragon.

Also in 1283, Peter's brother James II of Majorca joined the French and recognised their suzerainty over Montpellier. This gave the French free passage into Catalonia through Roussillon as well as access to the Balearic Islands. In October, Peter began preparing the defences of Catalonia. In 1284, Pope Martin IV granted the Kingdom of Aragon to Charles, Count of Valois, another son of the French king and great-nephew of Charles I of Anjou. Papal sanction was given to a war to conquer Aragon on behalf of Charles of Valois.

Aragonese Crusade

In 1284, the first French armies under Philip and Charles entered Roussillon. They included  cavalry,  crossbowmen, and  infantry, along with 100 ships in south French ports. Though the French had James's support, the local populace rose against them. The city of Elne was valiantly defended by the so-called "bastard of Roussillon", the illegitimate son of Nuño Sánchez, late count of Roussillon. Eventually he was overcome and the cathedral was burnt; the royal forces progressed.

In 1285, Philip entrenched himself before Girona in an attempt to besiege it. The resistance was strong, but the city was taken. Charles was crowned there, but without an actual crown. The French soon experienced a reversal, however, at the hands of Roger de Lauria, back from the Italian theatre of the drawn-out conflict. The French fleet was defeated and destroyed at the Battle of Les Formigues on 4 September 1285. In addition, the French camp was hit hard by an epidemic of dysentery.

The King of France himself was afflicted. The King of Navarre, the heir apparent to the French throne, opened negotiations with Peter for free passage for the royal family through the Pyrenees. But the troops were not offered such passage and were decimated at the Battle of the Col de Panissars. Philip III of France died in October at Perpignan, the capital of James II of Majorca (who had fled in fear after being confronted by Peter), and was buried in Narbonne. James was declared a vassal of Peter.

Troubadour works
Peter matched his father in patronage of the arts and literature, but unlike him he was a lover of verse, not prose. He favoured the troubadours, having himself created two sirventesos. The first is in the form of an exchange between himself and Peironet, a troubadour. The second is part of a compilation of five compositions from Peter himself, Bernat d'Auriac, Pere Salvatge, Roger-Bernard III of Foix, and an anonymous contributor.

As well the wars with Philip III of France and James II of Majorca furnished material for new sirventesos and during this period the sirventes was converted into a convenient tool of political propaganda in which each side could, directly or allegorically, present its case and procure sympathy propitious to its cause.

Death and legacy
Peter died from unknown causes at Vilafranca del Penedès in November 1285, just one month after Philip III of France, and was buried in the Monastery of Santes Creus. His deathbed absolution occurred after he declared that his conquests had been in the name of his familial claims and never against the claims of the church. His remains are entombed in a porphyry sarcophagus at the monastery.

Like his father, Peter divided his kingdoms between his sons. He left Aragon to his eldest son, Alfonso III, and Sicily to his second son, James II. Peter's third son, Frederick, in succession to his brother James, became regent of Sicily and in due course its king. Peter did not provide for his illegitimate youngest son and namesake, Peter. This Peter left Spain for Portugal with his half-sister Elizabeth.

In the Divine Comedy, (Purgatory, Canto VII) Dante Alighieri sees Peter "singing in accord" with his former rival, Charles I of Anjou, outside the gates of Purgatory.

Children
Peter and Constance II of Sicily had six children:

Alfonso III of Aragon (–).
James II of Aragon (–). 
Elizabeth, Queen of Portugal (–). Married Denis of Portugal.
Frederick II of Sicily (–).
Yolande, Duchess of Calabria (–). Married Robert of Naples.
 (–). Married Guillemette of Béarn, daughter of Gaston VII, Viscount of Béarn.

Peter had a relationship with Ines Zapata between 1275-1280 and had the following children:

Fernando of Aragon.
Sancho of Aragon.
Pedro of Aragon. Married in Portugal with Constança Mendes da Silva.
Teresa of Aragon.

Additionally, he had 3 illegitimate children with Maria Nicolau before marrying Constance of Sicily:

Jaime Perez of Aragon (d. 1285).
Juan Perez of Aragon.
Beatriz of Aragon (d. 1316).

References

Bibliography

 
 
 
 
 
 

|-

1239 births
1285 deaths
13th-century Aragonese monarchs
13th-century Kings of Sicily
Catalan-language poets
Counts of Barcelona
House of Barcelona
House of Barcelona (Sicily)
Jure uxoris kings
Male composers
People of the War of the Sicilian Vespers
People temporarily excommunicated by the Catholic Church
Valencian monarchs